This Time It's Love is a 1998 studio album by jazz vocalist Kurt Elling, accompanied as usual (since Elling's debut) by Laurence Hobgood on piano, Rob Amster on bass, and on drums Michael Raynor, who replaces Paul Wertico for the most part. On five of the twelve tracks guest musicians were invited, like guitarist David Onderdonk or Chicagoan veteran jazz musicians, violinist Johnny Frigo and Eddie Johnson. Hobgood and Elling co-produced the recording with Wertigo as associate. Elling's third album was again released on the Blue Note label, which initially asked him "to do something more on the romantic side", as Elling writes in the liner notes. The album's repertoire is predominantly standard material with two songs added that were already played by the band, the lauded "Freddie's Yen for Jen" (see 'Reception' below) and McCoy Tyner's "My Love, Effendi" with lyrics by Elling, and "Where I Belong", another original. The bossa nova classic "Rosa Morena" by Dorival Caymmi is the first song Kurt Elling recorded in a foreign language, accompanied here just by acoustic guitar and bass.

Reception

The Allmusic review by Tim Sheridan awarded the album four stars, and said Elling "finds a happy medium between romantic rumination and vocal experimentation. The highlight of the disc is "Freddie's Yen for Jen," a stellar jazz experience that comes pretty damn close to committing the pure emotion of love to tape".
Morton and Cook wrote in their Penguin Guide to Jazz: "The highlight of This Time It's Love is a superb vocalese based on Lester Young's solo on "She's Funny That Way", but" –agreeing with Sheridan– "it is almost topped by "Freddie's Yen for Jen", which takes its inspiration from Freddie Hubbard and is one of the most compelling vocal performances in recent times."

This Time It's Love received a Grammy Nomination for Best Vocal Jazz Performance, the third nomination in a row since Elling's debut, but lost to Shirley Horn's I Remember Miles.

Track listing
 "My Foolish Heart" (Victor Young, Ned Washington) - 4:03
 "Too Young to Go Steady" (Jimmy McHugh, Harold Adamson) - 5:03
 "I Feel So Smoochie" (Phil Moore) - 3:18
 "Freddie's Yen for Jen" (P. Hubbard, Kurt Elling) - 7:21
 "My Love, Effendi" (McCoy Tyner, Elling) - 3:36
 "Where I Belong" (Laurence Hobgood, Elling) - 4:20
 "The Very Thought of You" (Ray Noble) - 5:45
 "The Best Things Happen While You're Dancing" (Irving Berlin) - 2:57
 "Rosa Morena" (Dorival Caymmi) - 4:34
 "She's Funny That Way" (Neil Moret, Richard A. Whiting) - 5:16
 "A Time for Love" (Johnny Mandel, Paul Francis Webster) - 5:23
 "Ev'ry Time We Say Goodbye" (Cole Porter) - 3:28

Personnel
Kurt Elling - vocals
Laurence Hobgood - piano (on all tracks, except track 9)
Rob Amster - double bass (exc. 10, 12)
Michael Raynor - drums (1-5, 7, 8)
Paul Wertico - drums (6, 11)
David Onderdonk - guitar (3, 6, 9, 11)
Brad Wheeler - soprano saxophone (6, 11)
Eddie Johnson - tenor saxophone (2)
Johnny Frigo - violin (3)

Production
Laurence Hobgood, Kurt Elling - producers
Paul Wertico - associate producer
Steve Weeder - recording and mixing engineer
Steve Johnson - assistant engineer
Danny Leake - mastering
Gordon H. Jee - art direction
P. R. Brown - design, digital illustration
Marc Hauser - photography

References

Blue Note Records albums
Kurt Elling albums
1998 albums